Ricardo Cardozo (born 14 January 1993) in Goa, is an Indian footballer who plays as a goalkeeper for Mohun Bagan in the I-League.

Career

Mohun Bagan

In January 2018, Ricardo Cardozo joined the new side Mohun Bagan.

Career statistics

Honours

Club
Mohun Bagan
Calcutta Football League (1): 2018–19

Goa lusophony 
2014 Lusophony Games (1)

References

1993 births
Living people
Footballers from Goa
Indian footballers
I-League players
Mohun Bagan AC players
Association football goalkeepers